Albert Ernest Farrow (1886 – 28 September 1916) was an English professional footballer who played as a left half in the Football League for Gainsborough Trinity.

Personal life 
Farrow served as a private in the Lincolnshire Regiment, the Green Howards and the South Staffordshire Regiment during the First World War. He was diagnosed with tuberculosis in 1916 and was discharged from the army in August that year. Farrow died of the disease the following month and was buried in Gainsborough General Cemetery.

Career statistics

References

1886 births
1916 deaths
People from Gainsborough, Lincolnshire
English footballers
English Football League players
Association football midfielders
Gainsborough Trinity F.C. players
Watford F.C. players
British Army personnel of World War I
Royal Lincolnshire Regiment soldiers
Green Howards soldiers
South Staffordshire Regiment soldiers
Worksop Town F.C. players
Southern Football League players
Midland Football League players
20th-century deaths from tuberculosis
Tuberculosis deaths in England
Military personnel from Lincolnshire